Carmichaelia curta is a species of plant in the family Fabaceae. It is found in New Zealand. It is classified as having the "Nationally Critical" conservation status under the New Zealand Threat Classification System.

References

curta
Flora of New Zealand
Taxa named by Donald Petrie